The Southwest Virginia Museum Historical State Park is a Virginia museum, run as a state park, dedicated to preserving the history of the southwestern part of the state.  It is located in Big Stone Gap, in a house built in the 1880s for Virginia Attorney General Rufus A. Ayers. It was designed and built by Charles A. Johnson. Construction began in 1888 and was completed in 1895.

The limestone and sandstone used on the exterior walls came from local quarries. Red oak lines the interior walls and ceilings. A small moat once surrounded the house.

The structure was acquired by the state in 1946 from a foundation managed by C. Bascom Slemp.  Much of the museum collection focuses on the coal boom of the 1890s; there are also exhibits dedicated to the history of Big Stone Gap and the surrounding area, and the story of the pioneers that migrated westward during the 18th century. The museum is also the location of the Southwest Virginia Walk of Fame.

The museum building was listed on the National Register of Historic Places in 2002.

See also 
National Register of Historic Places listings in Wise County, Virginia
 List of Virginia state parks
 List of Virginia state forests

References

Park webpage

Houses on the National Register of Historic Places in Virginia
State parks of Virginia
State parks of the Appalachians
Museums in Wise County, Virginia
Parks in Wise County, Virginia
History museums in Virginia
Historic house museums in Virginia
Houses in Wise County, Virginia
National Register of Historic Places in Wise County, Virginia
Southwest Virginia
Walks of fame
Houses completed in 1895
Museums established in 1946
Protected areas established in 1946
1946 establishments in Virginia